Benjamin Scott Falcone (born August 25, 1973) is an American actor, comedian and  filmmaker. He is married to actress Melissa McCarthy, with whom he frequently collaborates. Falcone made his directorial debut in 2014 with Tammy, which he co-wrote with McCarthy, and he also directed, co-wrote, and produced The Boss, Life of the Party, Superintelligence, and Thunder Force, all of which starred McCarthy. In 2022, Falcone starred in Netflix series God's Favorite Idiot, which he created. 

He has also had cameos in Bridesmaids, Identity Thief, The Heat, Spy, Can You Ever Forgive Me?, and  Nine Perfect Strangers all of which starred his wife.

Personal life
Falcone was born in Carbondale, Illinois, the son of Peg and Steve Falcone. He is of Italian, English, German, and Irish descent.

Falcone married his longtime girlfriend, actress Melissa McCarthy, on October 8, 2005. They have two children.

Filmography

Film

Acting roles
 Cheaper by the Dozen 2 (2005) - Theater Patron
 Garfield: A Tail of Two Kitties (2006) - Tourist at Castle
 Smiley Face (2007) - Agent
 The Nines (2007) - Himself
 Cook Off! (2007) - Cameron Strang
 Bridesmaids (2011) - Air Marshal Jon
 What to Expect When You're Expecting (2012) - Gary Cooper
 Identity Thief (2013) - Tony
 The Heat (2013) - Blue-Collar Man
 Enough Said (2013) - Will
 Bad Words (2013) - Pete Fowler
 Tammy (2014) - Keith Morgan
 Spy (2015) - American Tourist
 The Boss (2016) - Marty
 Office Christmas Party (2016) - Doctor
 CHiPs (2017) - Bicycle Cop
 Life of the Party (2018) - Dale, the Uber Driver
 Scooby-Doo! and the Gourmet Ghost (2018) - Evan (voice)
 The Happytime Murders (2018) - Donny
 Can You Ever Forgive Me? (2018) - Alan Schmidt
 Superintelligence (2020) - Agent Charles Kuiper
 Thunder Force (2021) - Kenny
 Thor: Love and Thunder (2022) - Stage manager

Television 

Acting roles
 2002: Yes, Dear (1 episode) Stalker, Season 3 Episode 9
 2003: Gilmore Girls (1 episode) Fran's Lawyer Season 3 Episode 20 
 2004–2006: Joey (17 episodes)
 2010: Bones (1 episode) Death of a Queen Bee Season 5 Episode 17
 2011–2012: The Looney Tunes Show (Voice of Henery Hawk, 2 episodes)
 2012: Don't Trust the B---- in Apartment 23
 2012: Up All Night (1 episode)
 2012: Happy Endings (1 episode)
 2013: Go On (1 episode)
 2014–2015: New Girl – Mike 
 2014: A to Z (6 episodes)
 2017–18: Nobodies (12 episodes)
2022: God’s Favorite Idiot (16 episodes) - Clark Thompson

References

External links

1973 births
Living people
American male film actors
American male television actors
American writers of Italian descent
American people of German descent
American people of Irish descent
American people of English descent
21st-century American male actors
American male screenwriters
Male actors from Illinois
McCarthy family
People from Carbondale, Illinois
Writers from Illinois
Film directors from Illinois
Screenwriters from Illinois
American people of Italian descent